Sir William Richard Powlett Geary, 3rd Baronet (13 November 1810 – 19 December 1877) was an English Conservative Party politician. He sat in the House of Commons from 1835 to 1838.

He was the eldest son of Sir William Geary, 2nd Baronet, whom he succeeded in 1825.

Geary contested the 1832 general election in the newly created Western division of Kent, without success, but won the seat at the 1835 general election. He was re-elected in 1837, and held the seat until his resignation in 1838 by taking the Chiltern Hundreds.

On his death he was buried in St Peter and St Paul Church, Tonbridge. He had married Louisa Charlotte Bruce. The baronetcy passed to his brother Francis.

References

External links 

1810 births
1877 deaths
Conservative Party (UK) MPs for English constituencies
UK MPs 1835–1837
UK MPs 1837–1841
Baronets in the Baronetage of Great Britain